Samuel "Samu" Castillejo Azuaga (born 18 January 1995) is a Spanish professional footballer who plays as a winger for La Liga club Valencia.

Club career

Málaga
Castillejo was born in Barcelona, Catalonia where his father, a Guardia Civil officer, was stationed at the time; the family resettled in Málaga, Andalusia within a few months. He graduated from Málaga CF's youth system, made his senior debut with the reserves in 2011 aged only 16, and went on to play three full seasons in Tercera División. He was given the nickname El Fideo ("the noodle" in Spanish), due to his "wiry frame and ability to squirm away in tight spaces".

In June 2014, Castillejo was called up by first-team manager Javi Gracia for the pre-season. He was named player of the match in a 3–1 friendly win against Newcastle United where he scored twice. He was promoted to the main squad the following month.

Castillejo made his debut with the first team on 29 August 2014, coming on as a substitute for fellow youth graduate Juanmi in the 57th minute of a 3–0 La Liga away loss to Valencia CF. He scored his first professional goal on 2 February, the winner in a home victory over the same opposition.

Villarreal
Castillejo joined Villarreal CF on 18 June 2015 alongside his Málaga teammate Samu García, signing a five-year deal. He scored six times in his third season, helping his team to qualification for the UEFA Europa League after a fifth-place finish.

AC Milan
Castillejo signed with AC Milan on 17 August 2018, with Carlos Bacca moving in the opposite direction. He made his Serie A debut on 31 August, starting in the 2–1 win against A.S. Roma at San Siro. He scored his first goal for the club on 30 September, in a 4–1 away defeat of U.S. Sassuolo.

During the summer 2021 transfer window, following a lacklustre season, Castillejo was a priority sale; despite a number of offers, he and his agent failed to agree on a particular one. He was omitted from a 25-player squad list for the UEFA Champions League.

Valencia
On 12 July 2022, Castillejo signed a three-year contract with Valencia.

Style of play
Castillejo plays mainly as a winger on either side of the pitch, although he relies mostly on his stronger left foot. He also plays occasionally as a supporting striker or a false 9.

Personal life
In June 2020, Castillejo was robbed of his watch at gunpoint in Milan.

Career statistics

Club

Honours
AC Milan
Serie A: 2021–22

References

External links
Valencia official profile

 

1995 births
Living people
Spanish footballers
Footballers from Barcelona
Footballers from Málaga
Association football wingers
La Liga players
Tercera División players
Atlético Malagueño players
Málaga CF players
Villarreal CF players
Valencia CF players
Serie A players
A.C. Milan players
Spain youth international footballers
Spain under-21 international footballers
Spanish expatriate footballers
Expatriate footballers in Italy
Spanish expatriate sportspeople in Italy